This is a summary of the electoral history of Sir Joseph Ward, Prime Minister of New Zealand, (1906–12; 1928–30) Leader of the Liberal Party (1906–12; 1913–19; 1928–30) and Member of Parliament for Awarua (1887–1919) and Invercargill (1925–1930).

Parliamentary elections

1887 election

1890 election

1893 election

1896 election

1897 by-election

1899 election

1902 election

1905 election

1908 election

1911 election

1914 election

1919 election

1923 by-election

1925 election

1928 election

Local elections

1881 election

1882 election

1883 election

References

Works cited
 

Ward, Joseph